Surigh Yilganing Kol (also known as Salikyila Genzhi Tso, zh; 萨利吉勒干南库勒) is an alkaline lake located in the disputed territory of Aksai Chin in Hotan Prefecture of Xinjiang province of China.

Location 
The lake is located in the southeast part of Lingzi Thang plains, and can be reached through an unpaved road passing from north bank of Lake Songmuxi Co. The road originates as an offshoot of China National Highway 219 at 35°38′46.34″N 80°18′33.85″E.

History 
In the 1950s, prior to the Sino-Indian War, India collected salt from this lake and two other lakes in Aksai Chin to study the economic feasibility of potential salt mining operations. Only Aksai Chin Lake was deemed economically viable.

References 

Lakes of Ladakh
Geography of Xinjiang
Hotan Prefecture
Territorial disputes of China
Territorial disputes of India
Aksai Chin